Oldřich Machač (18 April 1946 in Prostějov – 10 August 2011 in Brno) was a Czech ice hockey player who played in the Czechoslovak Extraliga.  He won three medals in three Winter Olympic games.  He was inducted into the International Ice Hockey Federation Hall of Fame in 1999.

References

External links 
 
 IIHF Hockey Hall of Fame bio (archived)
 
 
 

1946 births
2011 deaths
Ice hockey players at the 1968 Winter Olympics
Ice hockey players at the 1972 Winter Olympics
Ice hockey players at the 1976 Winter Olympics
Medalists at the 1972 Winter Olympics
Medalists at the 1976 Winter Olympics
Medalists at the 1968 Winter Olympics
Olympic bronze medalists for Czechoslovakia
Olympic ice hockey players of Czechoslovakia
Olympic medalists in ice hockey
Olympic silver medalists for Czechoslovakia
Sportspeople from Prostějov
HC Kometa Brno players
HC Košice players
IIHF Hall of Fame inductees
Starbulls Rosenheim players
Czechoslovak ice hockey defencemen
Czech ice hockey defencemen
Czechoslovak expatriate sportspeople in West Germany
Czechoslovak expatriate ice hockey people
Expatriate ice hockey players in West Germany